The Hessen State Police (German: Hessische Polizei) numbers approximately 15,500 police officers and 2,500 civilian employees.

Organisation

The seven regional police authorities are headquartered in Kassel (Nordhessen), Giessen (Mittelhessen), Fulda (Osthessen), Frankfurt, Wiesbaden (Westhessen), Offenbach am Main (Südosthessen) and Darmstadt (Südhessen). Following a police reform in 2001, the regional police authorities are now directly subordinate to the Interior Ministry.

The State Police Commissioner’s post became a “political” appointment and one to which police officers can be appointed (unlike in the other states). For the state and regional police commissioners and their respective deputies, Hessen has a policy of “duality” meaning that if the top official is a police officer, the deputy will be a public administrator (usually ex-law grad) or vice versa.

Another Hessen innovation is the abolition of the “green star” ranks meaning Hessen’s police officers start to work the road as Kommissar, which equals the rank of a lieutenant. This is aimed at making the police profession more attractive and improving promotion chances. Hessen is also one of the Länder that does not train its cadets through the Bepos but has its own department at the state College of Public Administration and a professional development school, both directly responsible to the state police commissioner.  In 2005, Hessen state government decided to change to blue police uniforms and adopt blue livery for police vehicles. The conversion to blue uniforms was completed in 2009.

Volunteer Police
Citizens also participate in public safety. This commitment to civic action is seen in the Volunteer Police program, where some citizens voluntarily assist their local police. The volunteers are trained for 50 hours, receive a blue uniform, pepper spray and a mobile phone. Their main duty is crime prevention: conducting walking patrols to deter street crime, patrolling near schools and kindergartens and maintaining contact with potential victims of crime and juvenile delinquents. People can also join the Wachpolizei which has less competencies (and less pay) than regular police to perform basic police tasks such as traffic or guard duties, releasing regular officers for patrol work.

State Investigation Bureau
The Landeskriminalamt (State Investigation Bureau) is situated in Wiesbaden and employs 680 officers and civilian staff. Its missions are: witness protection, state security, coordination of SWAT (Spezialeinsatzkommando or SEK) team operations, undercover investigations, statistics, monitoring the development of crime, crime prevention, criminal investigations analysis, exchange of information with foreign countries and forensic science. The Hessen State Police has two SEKs, one covering the north of the state (based in Kassel) and one covering the south (based in Frankfurt).

Police Support Group 
The Police Support Group HQ (Bereitschaftspolizeipräsidium) in Mainz-Kastel controls the state’s mobile police reserve, the river police, police orchestra, mounted police center in Frankfurt and police helicopter squadron and has approx. 2,400 officers. The four reserve battalions Bereitschaftspolizeiabteilungen (BPA) are situated in Mainz-Kastel, Lich, Kassel and Mühlheim am Main. The river police has six stations along the rivers Rhine, Main, Fulda, Werra and Lahn and one for the Edersee reservoir. The helicopter squadron is stationed at Egelsbach Airfield between Darmstadt and Frankfurt. It has three choppers and one fixed-wing aircraft for missions anywhere in Hesse.

Police Academy 
The Hessian Police Academy is situated in Wiesbaden and offers seminars and courses for Hessian police members. A driver training center is located at the former U.S. ammunition storage point in Hünstetten-Limbach. However, the police training itself is done by the "Hochschule für Polizei und Verwaltung" (University of Applied Sciences for Police and Administration with dependencies in Wiesbaden, Mühlheim am Main, Kassel and Giessen.

See also
Landespolizei

External links
 Polizei.de 
 Police in Hessen homepage 
 University of Applied Sciences for Police and Administration homepage 

Organisations based in Hesse
State law enforcement agencies of Germany